The 1900 Normal School Owls football team was an American football team that represented the Normal School of Arizona (later renamed Arizona State University) as an independent during the 1900 college football season. In their third season under head coach Frederick M. Irish, the team compiled a 1–1 record and played both of its games against Phoenix High School, losing the first game, 5–0, and winning the second game by the same score.

Schedule

References

Normal School
Arizona State Sun Devils football seasons
Normal School Owls football